Sarahah is a Saudi Arabian social networking service for providing constructive feedback. In Arabic, sarahah means "frankness" or "honesty". It was created by Zain-Alabdin Tawfiq at the end of 2016 and reached a sudden worldwide success by mid-2017. This growth is considered to be deeply related with the release of a Snapchat update that allowed people to share URLs on their snaps.

Sarahah allowed people to text messages to others and the person reading that could then reply anonymously. Initially, it was meant for workers to compliment their bosses.

It was released on the US Apple App Store on 13 June 2017, and also had users in several other countries including Canada, India, and Lebanon. An update was released by Snapchat on July 5. Within two weeks, it was at the number 1 position. The rise was also seen in a Google Trends report.

On 26 August 2017, it was reported that the Sarahah mobile app quietly uploads the user's address book to its web servers.

Spam was frequent, sent by third-party apps claiming to be able to reveal the usernames of anonymous senders.

On 12 January 2018, it was reported that a woman in Queensland, Australia had started a petition to have the app and others like it banned, after friends of her 13-year-old daughter sent her abusive messages, including ones suggesting that she kill herself. A news report from the Australian Special Broadcasting Service (SBS) stated that the child's mother, Katrina, "called on Apple's App Store and Google Play to stop downloads of Sarahah, which allows people to leave anonymous feedback for each other". On 21 February, Katrina posted a message declaring success, saying that both Apple and Google had removed the app from their stores.
On 15 December 2021, Zain-Alabdin Tawfiq announced via Twitter:
 This was retweeted by Sarahah's Twitter account.

Notable uses

NGOs 
An Indian NGO, Ungender, has used Sarahah to tackle the issue of sexual harassment

See also 
 Anonymous social media
 Ask.fm – a service which used to be anonymous, and was linked to several teen suicides in 2013
 Secret (app) – a similar service which was shut down in 2015

References

External links 
 

Computer-related introductions in 2016
Saudi Arabian social networking websites
Anonymous social media
Internet properties established in 2016
Android (operating system) software
IOS software
Question-and-answer websites